Mate Pavić and Michael Venus were the defending champions, but Pavić chose to compete in Sydney instead. Venus played alongside Robert Lindstedt, but lost in the first round to Nicholas Monroe and Artem Sitak.

Marcin Matkowski and Aisam-ul-Haq Qureshi won the title, defeating Jonathan Erlich and Scott Lipsky in the final, 1–6, 6–2, [10–3].

Seeds

Draw

Draw

References
 Main Draw

ASB Classic – Men's Doubles
ASB